Elwin may refer to:

Elwen, Cornish saint
Elwin, Illinois, United States, an unincorporated community
Hastings Elwin (1776-1852), British-Australian politician
Whitwell Elwin (1816 -1900), British clergyman and editor
Maurice Elwin (1896–1975), British singer and songwriter, real name Norman Blair
Verrier Elwin, (1902–1964), British-Indian anthropologist and ethnologist
Ross Elwin (born 1946), retired Australian rules football player